{{Infobox magazine
| title = The Federalist
| image_file = The_Federalist_Logo.png
| image_caption = Official logo of The Federalist
| company = Columbia's Only Newspaper that Edits its Own Wikipedia Page"
| frequency = Tri-Semesterly
| circulation = 5,000
| language = English
| category = Humor
| firstdate = October 1986
| country = United States
| website = columbiafederalist.com
}}The Federalist, known colloquially and more commonly as The Fed, is a tabloid-sized (as opposed to broadsheet) newspaper published every three weeks at Columbia University in New York City. Founded in 1986 by Neil M. Gorsuch, Andrew Levy and P.T. Waters, the paper has undergone many changes in mission, style, form, and success, though it has experienced relatively few interruptions in production since the publication of its first issues. Currently the paper publishes topical humor and satirical content.

History

1986–1989
The early Fed carried the full "Federalist Paper" masthead and advertised itself as "a newspaper in the tradition of Columbians Hamilton and Jay." The founding members were "a libertarian, conservative, and a socialist, (although no one knows which was which)."

The founders were Andy Levy (likely the libertarian), Neil Gorsuch (likely the conservative), and P.T. Waters (not likely a socialist).  The paper's mission was to create a "classically liberal" forum with content centered primarily on issues and news topics considered "politically delicate" at Columbia, such as race relations, discussions as to Barnard's place in the newly co-ed institution, and whether anyone at the school actually listened to the august WKCR.

The February 13, 1987 issue of National Review contained an article about the founding of the paper written by Columbia College graduate D. Keith Mano, the novelist, literary critic and contributor to Esquire and other magazines.

The political and cultural tone of Columbia in the mid to late 80's was still very much oriented toward the free speech protest movements of the late 60's, and the associated far left politics dominated campus political culture. This left a tremendous amount of room on the political spectrum to the right.  As early as the first few issues, the paper referred to itself as "the Fed" and wrote editorials in an informal, personal style.

Levy and Waters stepped away from the paper on friendly terms following the October 6, 1987 issue. Gorsuch continued with the paper in the fall of 1987 as the editor, with additional staff, including Eric Prager, Adel Aslani-far, and Nathan Nebeker. Nebeker succeeded Gorsuch as the editor in the Spring of 1988 and continued this tone.  Gorsuch was still closely involved in the paper as editor emeritus, and writer.  Articles were often long and dense, with only hints of satire.

Gorsuch graduated Columbia in May 1988 one year early and went to Harvard Law School that fall.  Prager assumed the editorial position in the fall of 1988, and Nebeker continued as editor emeritus and a writer. Nebeker started a regular column called "Ad Hominem," where the satire and humor that later came to define the Fed was fully present.  The target of these columns was the often sanctimonious, far left leaning political expressions on campus. Nebeker wrote the column until his graduation in May 1989.

1990–1992
By 1990, The Federalist Paper was already feeling the pinch of low content. Issues from the era display an increasing disregard for layout and copy-editing (a charge often leveled at the paper regardless of the format), a decline in advertising from former stalwarts such as Coors and Kaplan, and an editorial board that drew almost exclusively conservative commentators. The board of 1992, after a fierce debate, recommitted itself to the "classically liberal" stance of the founders and began a charge towards diversity of opinions.

1992–1996
During this period, the paper became known as the leading informational publication at Columbia.  It also retained its re-affirmed mandate of providing a forum for diverging view-points, consistent with its classically liberal worldview. Later, some members of the Federalist's editorial staff would deride this period in the paper's history, such as former Editor-in-Chief Laurie Marhoefer, who suggested that the paper declined in these years under pressure from other campus competitors, including the then-progressive Spectator and the socialist-sponsored Modern Times (long-since defunct). Yet the Federalist published consistently in the early to mid-nineties, and the paper ran at a profit due to its advertising sales and funding from the Intercollegiate Studies Institute, a national organization dedicated to the support of similar papers nationwide.

1996–1998
Mirroring Columbia's own campaign to upgrade its image, editor-in-chief Marc Doussard organized a massive layout overhaul and placed an increased emphasis on local social commentary. "They Watch," a regular feature, began running on Page 12. Topics ranged from sex to alcoholism to grade inflation.  Readership of the paper increased dramatically.

But success came at a price. The paper's staff became increasingly insular, refusing to recruit members as older staffers graduated, believing itself capable of running on nothing. By Fall 1997, the staff dwindled to two editors, who produced only one mammoth issue. As the spring semester of 1998 opened, their layout computer crashed, taking with it all records and templates. The Federalist Paper was finished.

1999–2003
In the fall of 1998, a few readers of the older Federalist elected to restart the paper, committing to the same peculiar blend of viewpoints, with a focus on the humor and absurdism that made the previous incarnation appealing. After a few false starts (no one on the staff had any experience in laying out a newspaper, and as such the initial issues were printed in an oversized font) and an anonymous donation, The Fed began to produce regular content.

Unlike the prior incarnation, however, the editors of The Fed recruited heavily and often, with antics like the "Fed Bash" (see below) and their Orientation issues distributed to every incoming student's dorm room providing fresh faces and new ideas. As those that remembered The Federalist Paper graduated and publications like The Onion rose to national prominence, The Fed moved firmly in the direction of humor.

The logo designed by Ned Ehrbar, featuring two stick figures in front of Low Library engaging in sodomy labeled as "Columbia" and "You," became a campus staple. By 2003, however, The Fed began to gather complaints. Some readers believed The Fed resorted to cheap jokes worthy of radio shock jocks, not a "subversive newspaper" (as the masthead then read).

2004
In February 2004, The Fed published a cartoon from the ongoing series "Whacky Fun Whitey" entitled "Blacky Fun Whitey." Columbia was already experiencing racial tensions on campus, after the Conservative Club authorized an "Affirmative Action Bake Sale" where items were sold at various prices depending on a person's race, gender, or political affiliation. Many took the cartoon to be demeaning to African-Americans and the concept of Black History Month, and coming after the events of the previous weeks, it was the last straw. Students formed groups calling for immediate action and multicultural awareness, alleging an insidious culture of discrimination was growing from ignorance at Columbia. Soon, cable news came calling. The entire editorial board and the artist published a full-page apology in the next issue. But the damage had been done, and The Fed received backhanded references from other campus news outlets, especially the Spectator, as "the racially insensitive student publication."

Readership began to decline over the next two years.  In addition, though the paper recruited new members in fall 2004, the staff slowly trended towards insularity again, with many deserting for publications such as the Blue and White. The paper was criticized for lack of content and its increasingly dated design.

2006–2014
The 2006–2007 academic year marked The Fed's 21st anniversary. It opened with a new layout design and included non-fictional material. Interviews with subjects such as Jon Voight, Al Franken and Steve Wozniak resulted in positive responses. Stand-alone comics such as the "Prez-Bo" also turned heads, and a large recruitment effort brought a bumper crop of new artists – making projects such as 22.2's full-page collaborative cover illustration possible. The humor content, too, has steadily improved, with articles emphasizing topical humor such as the Minuteman debacle and displaying a more concentrated style in general. Readership is still estimated to be lower than the 1999–2001 era, but for the first time seems to be trending upwards.

 2015–2021 
The year of 2015 marked a new era for The Fed. Led by Adam Kelly-Penso and McKenzie Fritz, the content of the newspaper shifted directions, becoming more professionally and artfully satirical. Kelly-Penso worked closely with his managing editors, Iqraz Nanji and Max Rosenberg, to launch a new website in the fall of 2015. Under the leadership of Nanji and Rosenberg (2016–2017), the newspaper increased manifold its presence online and in print. Gaining widespread popularity, the paper received an influx of writers and editors in 2016. Under the leadership of Gustie Owens and Nikhil Mehta,  the Fed made a significant push to publishes online content daily.

 2022-Present 
Under the leadership of Lauren Unterberger and Zoe Davidson, the Fed has cultivated its online and social media presence, as well as returned to its pre-pandemic printed splendor. The Fed currently boasts 75+ student writers, artists, and editors. "Wow the Federalist is really great," shared Columbia president, Lee C. Bollinger.

The Fed Bash
Perhaps unique among Columbia publications, The Fed held an annual spring event beginning in 2000, "Fed Bash," which featured live bands, burlesque dancers, and other performance artists, hosted in Columbia's Lerner Hall. Fed Bash has not been held in its original form since 2013, due to the Columbia Administration's 'War on Fun'. The Fed'' has not hosted a "Fed Bash" in recent years.

Colombia Spectator
Every year on April 1 since 2001, The Fed publishes an issue with identical specifications to the Columbia Daily Spectator. It is placed in Spectator racks around campus throughout the month of April in order to fool unsuspecting readers into picking it up instead of the day's Spectator.

Organization

Editor-in-Chief

The Editor-in-Chief, or Feditor-in-Chief is responsible for the all facets of publication of the paper, especially content. In recent years, there have traditionally been two Feditors-in-Chief per year. Recent editors have included:
 Laurie Marhoefer and Tom Bellin, 1998–2000.
 Anwar the C.H.U.D., 2000–2001.
 Meghan Keane, 2001–2002.
 Paul Campion, 2002.
 Kate Sullivan, 2002–2004.
 Mike Ilardi, 2004–2005.
 Sam Jenning, 2005–2006.
 Kareem Shaya, 2006–2007.
 Chas Carey, 2007–2008.
 Sam Reisman, 2008–2009.
 Rachel Paige Katz, 2009–2010.
 Jeffrey Scharfstein and Aarti Iyer, 2010–2011.
 Elliott Grieco, 2011–2012.
 Kaitlin Johnson and Jorja Knauer, 2012.
 Sam Kazer and David Salazar, 2013.
 Anna Quincy and Grace Rosen, 2014.
 McKenzie Fritz and Adam Kelly-Penso, 2015.
 Adam Kelly-Penso, 2016
 Iqraz Nanji and Max Rosenberg, 2016–2017
 Benjamin Greenspan and Thomas Germain, 2017–2018
 Ani Wilcenski and Benjamin Most, 2018–2019
 Alex Horn and Luis Vera, 2019–2020
 Julia Schreder and Annie Iezzi, 2020–2021 
 Gustie Owens and Nikhil Mehta, 2021-2022 
 Lauren Unterberger and Zoe Davidson, 2022-2023 (current)

Publisher 
The Publisher handles the more technical aspects of the paper including: printing, business and advertising and serving as point person for interactions with Columbia bureaucracy. Past Publishers have included:
 Edward Ehrbar, 2001–2003.
 Ethan Heitner, 2003–2004.
 Bill McLaughlin, 2004–2006.
 Russell Spitzer, 2006–2007.
 Michael Bredin, 2007–2008.
 Sophie Litschwartz, 2008–2009.
 Ben Ehrlich, 2009–2011.
 Conor Skelding, 2011–2012.
 Anna Quincy, 2012–2013.
 Jenna Lomeli, 2013.
 Adam Kelly-Penso, 2014.
 Brett Krasner, 2015.
 Mimi Evans, 2018.
 Sam Millner, 2019.

Managing Editor
Managing Editors are in charge of managing the publication of both the print paper and online content. This includes oversight of the entire production process as well as management of the website and social media. Managing Editors work to grow readership, manage recruitment, and generate revenue through ads. Recent Managing Editors have included:
 Sabrina Singer, 2013–2014.
 Hailey Riechelson, 2014.
 Hailey Riechelson and Miranda Roman, 2016.
 Benjamin Greenspan and Thomas Germain, 2016–2017.
 Ani Wilcenski, 2017–2018
 Nicolas Ribolla, 2018
 Mimi Evans, 2019
 Joseph Baer, 2019–2020
 Nurasyl Shokeyev and Gustie Owens, 2020–2021 
 Jayne Magliocco and Amelia Fay, 2021-2022 
 Fenway Donegan and Dani Rivera, 2022-2023 (current)

Head Submissions Editors
Head Submissions Editors are in charge of managing the submissions (of which there are many). This includes the grueling but rewarding process of selecting which articles will go through the editing process and eventually be published in each issue.
Recent Head Submissions Editors have included:
 Matt Nola and Zoe Davidson, 2021-2022
 Max Monical and Mollie Schmidtberger, 2022-2023 (current)

Social Media Editors
Inaugurated in the 2022-2023 year, the Social Media Editor is in charge of running the social media, creating video content, and keeping up with the online publication of articles.
Recent Social Media Editors have included:
 Sophie Simons, 2022-2023 (current)

Notable Fed alumni
 Neil Gorsuch, Associate Justice of the Supreme Court.
 Andrew Levy, ombudsman and contributor to Fox News Channel's late-night show Red Eye.

References

External links
 The Fed website
 The Fed article on WikiCU

Student newspapers published in New York (state)
Columbia University publications
Newspapers established in 1986